Imogiri (ꦲꦶꦩꦒꦶꦫꦶ in Javanese script or Imagiri in standard Javanese spelling) is a royal graveyard complex in Yogyakarta, in south-central Java, Indonesia, as well as a subdistrict under the administration of Bantul Regency. Imogiri is a traditional resting place for the royalty of central Java, including many rulers of the Sultanate of Mataram and of the current houses of Surakarta and Yogyakarta Sultanate. The name Imagiri is derived from Sanskrit Himagiri, which means 'mountain of snow'. The latter is another name for Himalaya.

Role and importance
The Royal Graveyard that preceded was Kota Gede. The graveyard was constructed by Sultan Agung of Mataram in the later years of his reign, probably in the 1640s.

The graveyard is a significant pilgrimage ziarah site, particularly on significant dates in the Javanese calendar (such as Satu Suro, New Year's Day), and the Islamic calendar.

It also belongs to a larger network of significant locations in Javanese pilgrimage traditions. It is possibly the only major location remaining in Java where the Palaces of Surakarta and Yogyakarta have personnel manning a jointly administered royal graveyard.

Among the site's most prominent graves are that of early Mataram ruler Sultan Agung, and Sultan of Yogyakarta Hamengkubuwono IX, a leader during Indonesia's war for independence. The most recent is that of Pakubuwana XII of Surakarta who was buried in 2004.

Folklore collected by Pranata in the 1970s, suggest that unusual stones in the steps preceding Sultan Agung's section of the graveyard cover the remains of Jan Pieterszoon Coen, which were allegedly stolen from the grave of 1629 in Batavia during the Siege of Batavia.

Construction

The Imogiri complex is separated into three parts, named Giriloyo, Banyusumurup and Imogiri. Traditionally it is accepted that Giriloyo was the earliest of the three graveyards. In some local folklore, Sultan Agung had commenced work on his own graveyard at Giriloyo – but because his uncle Juminah died at the graveyard, Agung was guided by various portents to choose his graveyard on a hill some three kilometres to the southwest, at Imogiri.  A later ruler, needing to bury outcasts in a graveyard separate from Giriloyo and Imogiri, chose Banyusumurup as an appropriate site. However it is possible to find rivals and enemies within Javanese royal families buried within metres of each other inside the walls of Imogiri.

Renovations

The Imogiri complex has had ongoing renovations since initial construction, due to exposure to tropical rain and weather, most materials at the graveyard have requires continual upkeep. Pakubuwono X during his reign spent a large amount of money on upgrading the Juru Kunci administration buildings in Imogiri village, the Mosque at the foot of the stairs, the stairs and the Graveyard in general. He also constructed the  Girimulya section as well. Hamengkubuwana VIII in the process of constructing Saptorenggo in the 1920s also conducted repairs on the earlier structures that required repairs. Various Suharto-era bureaucrats and army personnel with connections with branches of earlier rulers contributed to a number of roof renewals and other renovations. The Indonesian Government contributed to a project that rehabilitated the yard known by its split gate – the Supit Urang – under the auspices of the archaeology service and appropriate agencies in the 1980s. In the 1990s the main gate into Sultan Agungan also required repairs.

The 2006 earthquake in the region saw considerable damage to the complex. It is not known yet to what extent repairs and renovations are possible again, and from where the funds will emanate.

Layout

Many travel accounts, tourist guides and references to Imogiri imply a simple single whole. On closer examination the graveyard has more complexity within its structure. The complex is divided in two ways. First, there are separate Yogyakartan and Surakartan sections. Second, the whole graveyard is divided into eight sections which constitute three generations of ruler in each section.  Some are jointly governed by custodians (Juru Kunci) from Surakarta and Yogyakarta, while some are governed by representatives of one of these palaces only. The original area within the Imogiri graveyard is that area with Sultan Agung's grave – it is jointly governed.  The western wing of the graveyard is the Surakartan section, while the eastern wing is the Yogyakartan section.

Not all rulers of the Sultanate of Mataram are buried in the Imogiri complex; there are a number of rulers who are buried elsewhere in Java. Some immediate families of rulers were also buried in Imogiri, but not all; this was dependent upon each ruler's preferences. Printed lists of the burial plots within the royal graveyard complex are maintained for Imogiri to provide guidance for researchers looking for a specific grave site. This process is sometimes complicated by the multiple names some individuals were known by during their lives.

Sections
Each section is a walled compound with three internal sections – variation may occur in transcription for these terms.
 The Top section is named 'Prabayasa.'
 Middle section is named 'Kemangdhungan.'
 Entrance yard is called 'Srimanganti.'

Note that dates after rulers name are supposed dates of interment, variant dates are possible in some sources. They are given in Gregorian calendar years. Dates after construction are arbitrary and may vary up to 10 years.  In most cases the new walled compounds have been built prior to the death of the first ruler interred.  However it is possible that the grave precedes the walls, as is probably the case in Sultan Agungan, and those that follow. Most names listed have abbreviated forms, for Javanese royalty there are usually extra titles when written, any abbreviation here is for purposes of the list and not out of disrespect for the deceased or their status.

Chronological sequence
The following list is in the assumed order of construction of the walled areas at Imogiri. The first two are in the shared parts; afterwards, as the kingdom split, the sections are for the Yogyakartan and Surakartan rulers are separate.
 Kasultan Agungan (constructed in the 1640s)
 Sultan Agung   1645
 Amangkurat II  1703
 Amangkurat III 1734
 Paku Buwanan (constructed in the 18th century)
 Pakubuwana I  1719
 Amangkurat IV  1726
 Pakubuwana II  1749
 Kasuwargan Surakarta (constructed in the 1770s)
 Pakubuwana III 1788
 Pakubuwana IV  1820
 Pakubuwana V   1823
 Kasuwargan Yogyakarta (constructed in the 1780s)
 Hamengkubuwana I   1792
 Hamengkubuwana III 1814
 Besiyaran Yogyakarta (constructed in the 1820s)
 Hamengkubuwana IV  1826
 Hamengkubuwana V   1855
 Hamengkubuwana VI  1877
 Kapingsangan Surakarta (constructed in the 1840s)
 Pakubuwana VI    1846
 Pakubuwana VII   1858
 Pakubuwana VIII  1861
 Pakubuwana IX    1893
 Saptorenggo Yogyakarta (constructed in the 1920s)
 Hamengkubuwana VII   1921
 Hamengkubuwana VIII  1939
 Hamengkubuwana IX   1988
 Girimulya Surakarta (constructed in the 1930s)
 Pakubuwana X    1939
 Pakubuwana XI   1945
 Pakubuwana XII  2004

Understanding the structure and details of the graveyard
Most sections have a sequence of three generations – 'Ego' or Father, Son and grandson, where the succession is that simple. The ones that don't are: Kasuwargan Yogyakarta has a missing person (Hamengkubuwana II is buried at Kota Gede); Kapingsangan Surakarta has four due to family dynamics. Much earlier, Amangkurat I was buried at Tegal on the north coast of Java, and as a consequence is not in Paku Buwanan.
Juru Kunci Surakarta and Yogyakarta share the tending of the graves and courtyards in Sultan Agungan and Paku Buwanan.
International tourists are usually encouraged to enter the yard prior to Sultan Agungan, pay a registration, put on appropriate clothing, and visit Sultan Agungan.
Imogiri is now 'full up', both the Girimulya and Saptorenggo sections have three generations interred, unless the traditional practice is changed for any reason, the current living rulers in Surakarta and Yogyakarta would now need to prepare a new section each on each 'side' of the graveyard to continue the practice of the last 400 years. The construction works of the new section of the Yogyakarta side has been started.

See also

 Banyusumurup
 Giriloyo
 Javanese sacred places
 Surakarta
 Yogyakarta

Sources
 At Imogiri over the decades, various small publications have listed the main names of rulers buried in the graveyard.  In some cases they have had maps as well.
 Some websites have appropriated lists of royalty, and have reprinted the names of rulers, with dates.
 In the Yogyakarta and Paku Alam palaces there are 'silsilah' lists showing the successions.

Notes

References
 Moertjipto (translated by Hari Hartiko)(1992) The Legend of Imogiri – The Royal cemetery of Mataram Kingdom Jakarta, Directorate General of Tourism.

Non-English sources
 Djumadi, Thojib Pasareyan Pajimatan Imogiri Jaya Baya vol43. no.22 pp. 11–12, 45–47 (29/1/1989) (in Javanese language)
 Prawirawinarsa, Babad Alit Volkslektur no.462 (in Javanese script); transliteration

Further reading
 Epton, Nina Moonlight ceremony in the Sultan's Cemetery in 'The Palace and the Jungle', London: Oldbourne (1957)  pp. 157–160 also the same in Magic and Mystics of Java London: Octagon (1974) pp. 151–153
 Pranata Sultan Agung Hanyokrokusumo Jakarta: Yudha Gama

Guide books – plans
 Jagawijaya, R. Riya (and Djagapuraya, R.W.) (n.d.) Skema Makam Raja-Raja Di Imogiri (Indonesian)
 Suroso, Supriyono T.  (n.d.) Guide book – The Royal Cemetery of Imogiri Yogyakarta, ELS Language Services. (English)

External links
 
 The Mataram royal graveyard complex in Imogiri

 
Muslim cemeteries
Javanese culture
Ziyarat
Cemeteries in Java
Bantul Regency
Districts of the Special Region of Yogyakarta
Cultural Properties of Indonesia in Yogyakarta
Sultan Agung